Çan-2 power station is a 330-megawatt coal-fired power station in Turkey in Çanakkale Province, which burns local lignite.

References

External links 

 Çan-2 power station on Global Energy Monitor

Coal-fired power stations in Turkey